Accel may refer to:

 Accel (interbank network), an American payment network
 Accel Animation Studios, an Indian animation studio
 Accel Energy, Australian electricity generator
 Accel Frontline, an Indian IT services company
 Accel-KKR, a technology-focused private equity firm
 Accel (company), an American venture capital company
 Altium, formerly Accel Technologies a former San-Diego based CAD vendor
 Accel TET, trade name for Disulfiram, a drug used to treat alcoholism
 Accel Transmatic, an Indian research and development company
 Rolls-Royce ACCEL, a protypal airplane

See also

 Accell NV, Dutch bicycle company
 Accel World, a 2009 Japanese light-novel series written by Reki Kawahara and illustrated by HiMA
 Accel World: Infinite Burst, a Japanese animated film based on the novel series, released July 2016
 Acceleration (disambiguation)
 Accelerator (disambiguation)
 Accelerate (disambiguation)
 ACELL (disambiguation)
 Acel (disambiguation)